Aidoc Medical is an Israeli technology company that develops computer-aided simple triage and notification systems. Aidoc has obtained FDA and CE mark approval for its stroke, pulmonary embolism, cervical fracture, intracranial hemorrhage, intra-abdominal free gas, and incidental pulmonary embolism algorithms.

Their algorithms are in use in more than 900 hospitals and imaging centers, including Montefiore Nyack Hospital, LifeBridge Health, LucidHealth, Yale New Haven Hospital, Cedars-Sinai Medical Center, University of Rochester Medical Center, and Sheba Medical Center.

History
Aidoc was founded in 2016 by Elad Walach (CEO), Michael Braginsky (CTO) and Guy Reiner (VP R&D).

In April 2017, the company raised $7M, led by TLV Partners.

In April 2019, the company raised $27M, led by Square Peg capital.

In August 2018, Aidoc gained FDA clearance for its intracranial hemorrhage system, and in May 2019 it received clearance for the pulmonary embolism system.

In January 2020, the system for detecting large-vessel occlusions (LVOs) in head CTA examinations obtained FDA clearance.

Products and market
Aidoc has developed a suite of artificial intelligence products that flag both time-sensitive and time-consuming (for the radiologist) abnormalities across the body. The algorithms are developed with large quantities of data to provide diagnostic aid to a broad set of pathologies. The company offers an array of algorithms that span across the body including Intracranial hemorrhage, spine fractures (C, T & L), free air in the abdomen, pulmonary embolism and more. It developed "Always-on AI", a term coined by Elad Walach which refers to a type of artificial intelligence that is "Always-on" - constantly running in the background and automatically analyzing medical imaging data, identifying urgent findings and sparing radiologists from "drowning" in vast amounts of irrelevant data.

Aidoc's solutions cover medical conditions prevalent in all settings (ED/inpatient/outpatient), including level 1 trauma centers, outpatient imaging centers, teleradiology groups and are set up in over 200 medical centers worldwide. Notable customers include the University of Rochester Medical Center, Global Diagnostics Australia, Antwerp University Hospital, and AZ Maria Middelares hospital. According to the company, Aidoc has deep integrations with numerous PACS and workflow software providers (GE, Agfa, Nuance).

Clinical Research
A clinical study on Aidoc’ accuracy of deep convolutional neural networks for the detection of pulmonary embolism (PE) on CT pulmonary angiograms (CTPAs) was performed by the University Hospital of Basel and presented at the European Congress of Radiology, showing that the Aidoc algorithm reached 93% sensitivity and 95% specificity. Clinical research has also been performed to test the diagnostic performance of Aidoc's deep learning-based triage system for the flagging of acute findings in abdominal computed tomography (CT) examinations. Overall, the algorithm achieved a 93% sensitivity (91/98, 7 false-negative) and 97% specificity (93/96, 3 false-positive) in the detection of acute abdominal findings.

Additional clinical research on Aidoc's Intracranial Hemorrhage algorithm accuracy was presented at the European Congress of Radiology by Antwerp University Hospital, evaluating the use of its deep learning algorithm for the detection of intracranial hemorrhage on non-contrast enhanced CT of the brain. The University of Washington completed a study on the accuracy of Aidoc's intracranial hemorrhage algorithm.

References

External links
 Official website

Medical technology companies of Israel
Medical expert systems
Radiology
Technology companies established in 2016
Applications of artificial intelligence
Health informatics
Israeli companies established in 2016